Iveta Vítová (born Iveta Lutovská, 14 May 1983 in Jindřichův Hradec, Czechoslovakia) is a Czech TV host, model and beauty pageant titleholder who won Czech Miss in 2009 and competed at Miss Universe 2009 and placed Top 10.

Pageantry
Lutovská previously held the title of Miss Model of the World 2007 and most recently was crowned Czech Miss 2009. Lutovská represented the Czech Republic at the Miss Universe 2009 pageant on 23 August 2009 in Nassau, Bahamas, where she continued Czech Republic's stake in the Miss Universe pageant by placing in the semifinals for a consecutive third time finishing as a Top 10 finalist, finishing 8th overall.

Personal life
Lutovská married Jaroslav Vít in a ceremony in September 2011, taking the name Vítová.

References

External links
 
 

Living people
Miss Universe 2009 contestants
1983 births
Czech beauty pageant winners
Czech female models
People from Jindřichův Hradec